The National Board of Review Award for Best Director is one of the annual film awards given (since 1945) by the National Board of Review of Motion Pictures.

Winners

1940s

1950s

1960s

1970s

1980s

1990s

2000s

2010s

2020s

Multiple winners 
David Lean - 4
Martin Scorsese - 3
Ingmar Bergman - 2
Clint Eastwood - 2
David Fincher - 2
John Huston - 2
Akira Kurosawa - 2
Ang Lee - 2
John Schlesinger - 2
Steven Spielberg - 2
Quentin Tarantino - 2
William Wyler - 2
Fred Zinnemann - 2

References

National Board of Review Awards
Awards for best director
Awards established in 1945
1945 establishments in the United States